Voshteh or Veshteh or Vashteh may refer to:

Vashteh, Alborz
Voshteh, Qazvin